Jean Marie River Airport  is located adjacent to Jean Marie River, Northwest Territories, Canada.

References

Registered aerodromes in the Dehcho Region